This is a list of former monastic buildings in England that continue in use as parish churches or chapels of ease.
Nearly a thousand religious houses (abbeys, priories and friaries) were founded in England and Wales during the medieval period, accommodating monks, friars or nuns who had taken vows of obedience, poverty and chastity; each house was led by an abbot or abbess, or by a prior or prioress. By their foundation monasteries and nunneries (although not friaries) had acquired endowments of land, property and parochial tithes, and many had become further enriched through subsequent bequests and pilgrim donations. The majority of these houses had come into existence between the 11th and 13th centuries, but by the 14th century decline had set in, hastened by the Black Death in the middle of the century. Later medieval benefactors increasingly regarded charitable and educational establishments, parish and collegiate churches as more appropriate recipients of bequests and donations; and by the early 16th century some religious communities had become very small, and few were more than half full. In those years a number were amalgamated or dissolved through the initiatives of reforming bishops, the wealth released being used to endow grammar schools and colleges at Oxford and Cambridge Universities.

The process that has come to be known as the Dissolution of the Monasteries began formally in 1536 following the Act for Suppression of the Lesser Monasteries. This transferred the lands and the property of religious houses with an income of less than £200 a year to the crown. The motives behind this are complex, and include Henry VIII's conflict with the popes over his desire for a divorce, which led to the foundation of the Church of England; and also Henry's ambition to increase the income of the crown. Under this first Act, about one-third of the religious houses were closed. This resulted in the rebellion known as the Pilgrimage of Grace. The rebellion failed, and the process of dissolution was extended; abbots, abbesses and priors were placed under increasing pressure and threats in order to persuade them to surrender their monasteries to the crown; four who refused being accused of treason and executed. The last religious house to close was Waltham Abbey in March 1540.

The wealth and properties of the monasteries came into the ownership of the crown, although much was soon sold off; but what happened to the buildings of the abbeys, priories and friaries themselves varied. Most of them were immediately stripped of their valuable lead roofs, and fell into decay. Parts of some were converted into mansions by new owners. But, in around ten per cent of cases, former monastic churches or other buildings have continued in religious use for parochial worship. This was necessarily the case for that small number of religious houses where part already functioned as a full parish church, as at Wymondham Abbey. Secondly, there were a number of instances where wealthy parishes, or their benefactors, purchased a former monastic church as a replacement parish church building, as at Selby Abbey. Thirdly were those cases where part of a monastic church building was already in parochial use as a chapel of ease served by a stipendiary priest, in which case the dissolution commissioners would seek, if possible, for these clergy to continue as perpetual curates on fixed annual stipends charged against the former monastic endowments; with an appropriate portion of the monastic church retained for them to use. Priories of the Augustinian order, in particular, had been required by their rule to maintain a chapel of ease within their church for parochial worship, with the consequence that partial survival is more common for former Augustinian priory churches. Churches of dissolved friaries on the other hand, even though they had commonly served worshipping urban congregations, were rarely able to continue in parochial use as friaries lacked the foundation endowments from which a perpetual curacy might be established. Fourthly, former monastic structures that had fallen into ruin at the dissolution, or continued in secular use, were not infrequently brought back into use for parochial worship in later years out of subsequent private benefactions.

Ten medieval English cathedrals had been 'monastic', in that they had been simultaneously abbeys, and eight of these (Bath and Coventry being the exceptions) were refounded as secular cathedrals by Henry VIII. A further six former abbeys were raised to be cathedrals of newly created dioceses. Other former abbeys and priories became parish churches; of which two, Saint Albans and Southwark have become cathedrals since, while both also continuing to serve their respective parishes. In some cases the whole of a former monastic church continued as a parish church; ranging from survivals of near cathedral scale, as at Sherborne Abbey, to very modest chapels such as Aconbury Priory.  More commonly it is only parts of the original church that survived in parochial use, now incorporated into the fabric of a continuing church or chapel; as for example the north aisle of the nave of Wroxall Priory. At Beaulieu Abbey, it is the refectory that has been so converted. In a few cases, such as Tilty Abbey, the gatehouse chapel, the capella ante portas, now forms the parish church. Where former monastic churches were maintained after the dissolution as chapels of ease with their clergy as perpetual curates, in almost all instances these chapels will have been raised to full parish church status in the course of the 19th century.

118 former monastic buildings in England that have continued to function as parish churches or chapels of ease since the dissolution of the monasteries are included in this list, including some whose monastic functions had ceased much earlier; and also some whose conversion to parochial use happened in recent centuries. Churches are only listed where they maintain in situ at least some substantial elements of their former monastic fabric, the extent of which is noted. Excluded are those former monastic churches that have never functioned for parochial worship, including some, such as the chapel of Jesus College, Cambridge, that have remained otherwise in continuous religious use; and also those churches converted into cathedrals by Henry VIII. All these surviving monastic churches have been listed by English Heritage, most at Grade I, the others at Grade II* or II.

Key

Works

See also 
List of monastic houses in England

References

Bibliography

English abbeys